Renault Tanger Méditerranée is an industrial site of the Renault Group, located in the town of Malloussa near Tangier.

History
The factory was opened on February 9, 2012, inaugurated by the King of Morocco, Mohammed VI, in the presence of Renault Group CEO Carlos Ghosn. Around one billion euros were invested in the construction of the plant.

It produces the Dokker, Express, Sandero (since September 2013) and Lodgy, sold in Morocco or exported mainly to Europe (about 90 to 95% to the EU), Africa and the MENA region. On July 10, 2017, the plant celebrated its one millionth car produced in five years since opening.

The company is based in the free trade zone of the port city of Tangier. Due to the EU duty-free status, the vehicles cannot be exported to the countries of the Agadir Agreement.

A year before production began, the IFMIA (Institut de Formation aux Métiers de l'industrie Automobile), funded by the Moroccan state, was opened and plays a key role in training employees. CO₂ emissions are said to be 98% lower compared to a similar plant.

Production

Current production
 Dacia Sandero 3 (2021–present)
 Renault Express (2021–present)

Former production
 Dacia Lodgy (2012–2021)
 Dacia Dokker (2012–2021)
 Dacia Logan 2 (2012–2021)
 Dacia Sandero 2 (2012–2021)
 Dacia Logan MCV 2 (2013–2021)

Annual output

2020
 Lodgy: 26,937 units
 Sandero 2: 95,383 units
 Sandero 3: 8,627 units
 Dokker: 72,062 units
 Logan 2 MCV: 6,769 units
 Renault Express: 228 units

References

External links
 Official page

Renault
Vehicle manufacturing companies established in 2012